Armchair Passenger Transport was a bus and coach charter operator in London.

History
Armchair Passenger Transport was established as a coach operator in November 1960, being sold to EH Mundy in 1974. In June 1990 it became a London Regional Transport contractor when it commenced operating route 260 with 12 Alexander bodied Leyland Olympians and three Leyland Atlanteans. Other routes operated were  65, 117, 190, 209, 237, 485, E2 and E8.

Fleet livery was initially orange and white, before a red and orange livery was introduced to comply with a need for London buses to be 80% red.

In November 2004 the business was sold to ComfortDelGro with 86 buses and 22 coaches. It initially continued to operate as a separate entity before the bus operations were integrated with Metroline and the coach operations with Westbus UK in 2006.

References

External links
Company website
Showbus gallery

Former London bus operators
Former coach operators in England
Transport companies established in 1960
Transport companies disestablished in 2006
1960 establishments in England
2006 disestablishments in England
British companies established in 1960
British companies disestablished in 2006